Heather McAdam is an American actress.

McAdam's major acting projects have included the roles of Catherine "Cat" Margolis in the television series Sisters (1991–96), Dwana Pusser in Walking Tall (1981), and Michelle Ryan in Salvage 1 (1979). She has also made guest appearances on several other TV shows including Touched by an Angel, Beverly Hills 90210, Quantum Leap, The Facts of Life, Doogie Howser, M.D., and Matlock.

References

External links 
 

20th-century American actresses
American child actresses
American film actresses
American television actresses
Living people
Place of birth missing (living people)
21st-century American women
Year of birth missing (living people)